The 2011 Atlantic 10 Men's Soccer Tournament was the postseason tournament of the Atlantic 10 Conference for the 2011 season to determine the Atlantic 10 Conference’s champion and automatic berth into the 2011 NCAA Division I Men's Soccer Championship.

See also 
 Atlantic 10 Conference
 2011 in American soccer
 2011 NCAA Division I Men's Soccer Championship
 2011 NCAA Division I men's soccer season

References 

Atlantic 10 Conference
Atlantic 10 Men's Soccer Tournament